Kaleem Haitham (born 4 June 1998) is an English professional footballer who plays for Chichester City as a winger.

Club career
Born in Portsmouth, Haitham progressed through Portsmouth's youth categories. He signed a two-year scholarship contract on 4 July 2014.

Haitham made his professional debut on 1 September 2015, coming on as a late substitute for fellow youth graduate Brandon Haunstrup in a 0–2 Football League Trophy away defeat against Exeter City.

After being released by Pompey, Haitham joined Folland Sports. In 2017, he moved to Chichester City.

Career statistics

References

External links

1998 births
Living people
Footballers from Portsmouth
English footballers
Association football wingers
Portsmouth F.C. players
Wimborne Town F.C. players
Folland Sports F.C. players
Chichester City F.C. players